Maria Lanckorońska (1737-1826), was a Polish noblewoman. She is foremost known for her political activity. She was a supporter and participant of the Bar Confederation (1768-1772) and an known opponent of king Stanislaw.

References

 Ilustrowana Encyklopedia Trzaski, Everta i Michalskiego (1924-1927)

18th-century Polish–Lithuanian politicians
18th-century Polish women
1737 births
1826 deaths
People from Przysucha County
Maria
Bar confederates
18th-century Lithuanian women
18th-century women politicians